The following is a list of battles of the Romanian Navy, from the Romanian War of Independence to the Second World War.

Romanian War of Independence
Action off Măcin (25-26 May 1877) - Romanian-Russian victory

Potemkin mutiny
Action of 2 July 1905 - Romanian victory; Russian torpedo boat Ismail repulsed by two shells fired by the Romanian cruiser Elisabeta

Second Balkan War
Romanian landings in Bulgaria (14-15 July 1913) - Romanian victory

World War I
Raid on Ruse (27 August 1916) - Romanian victory

World War II

References

 
Romanian Navy
Romanian Navy, Battles